Elizabeth J. Braswell, often known as Liz Braswell, is an English-born American writer of young adult fiction. She is best known for The Nine Lives of Chloe King, a series that was adapted as a 2011 television show of the same name. She is also known to publish work under the names Tracy Lynn and Celia Thompson.

Early life and education
Braswell was born in Birmingham, England, and she grew up in a small New England town.

She graduated from Brown University with a degree in Egyptology.

Career
Braswell produced video games for almost a decade before she changed professions and began writing novels, mostly at Simon & Schuster Interactive, where, among other credits, she served as executive producer for Darkened Skye and Farscape: The Game.

Braswell has written for Disney Press, particularly as one of the authors for its Twisted Tales series which are revisionist novels dealing "What If" stories in the Disney canon.

As of 2022, Braswell has a column with the Wall Street Journal, reviewing fantasy, science-fiction, and horror.

List of Works

Novels
Snow (2003) (as Tracy Lynn)
RX (2005)
Stuffed (2019)
Stuffed: Into Darkness (2021)

The Nine Lives of Chloe King
The Fallen (2004) (as Celia Thomson)
The Stolen (2004) (as Celia Thomson)
The Chosen (2005) (as Celia Thomson)

The Big Empty
The Big Empty (2004) (as J. B. Stephens)
Paradise City (2004) (as J. B. Stephens)
Desolation Angels (2005) (as J. B. Stephens)
No Exit (2005) (as J. B. Stephens)

Pirates of the Caribbean: The Original Adventures of Young Jack Sparrow
The Coming Storm (2006) (as Rob Kidd)
The Age of Bronze (2006) (as Rob Kidd)
Silver (2007) (as Rob Kidd)
City of Gold (2007) (as Rob Kidd)
Dance of The Hours (2007) (as Rob Kidd)

Twisted Tales
A Whole New World (2015)
Once Upon a Dream (2016)
As Old As Time (2016)
Part of Your World (2018)
Straight on Till Morning (2019)
Unbirthday (2020)
What Once Was Mine (2021)
Go The Distance (2021)

Short fiction
One of Us (2009) (as Tracy Lynn)

Awards
Her book The Stolen won ALA Quick Picks for Reluctant Young Adult Readers and her book The Fallen won ALA Quick Picks for Reluctant Young Adult Readers and NYPL Books for the TeenAge.

References

External links
 
Interview by The Toronto Star
 
  (forthcoming August 2015)
 Tracy Lynn and Celia Thomson at LC Authorities, with 3 and 4 records
 
 

Living people
American children's writers
American fantasy writers
Video game producers
Year of birth missing (living people)
American women novelists
Writers from Birmingham, West Midlands
English emigrants to the United States
21st-century American novelists
21st-century American women writers
American women children's writers
Women writers of young adult literature
Women science fiction and fantasy writers
Brown University alumni
21st-century pseudonymous writers
Pseudonymous women writers